Bonilla is a surname of Spanish origin. It may refer to:
Alejandro Bonilla (1820-1901), Dominican painter and teacher
Andrea Bonilla (born 1978), Bolivian politician
Andrea Bonilla (runner) (born 1986), Ecuadorian long-distance runner
Armando Bonilla (born 1967), American attorney who is a Judge of the U.S. Court of Federal Claims
Arturo Bonilla (born 1953), Honduran footballer
Bobby Bonilla (born 1963), American baseball player who played from 1986 to 2001 in Major League Baseball
Breyner Bonilla (born 1986), Colombian footballer 
Byron Bonilla (born 1993), Nicaraguan footballer 
Cristian Bonilla (born 1993), Colombian footballer
Daryl Bonilla (born 1975), Hawaiian actor, comedian, and professional wrestler.
E. J. Bonilla (born 1988), American actor
Fernando Bonilla (born 1962), Puerto Rican politician who served as Secretary of State of the Commonwealth of Puerto Rico
Gerardo Bonilla – Professional race car driver.
Giselle Bonilla (born 1994), American actress.
Héctor Bonilla (born 1939), Mexican actor
Henry Bonilla – Former Congressman who represented Texas's 23rd congressional district in the U.S. House of Representatives.
Hugo Orellana Bonilla – Peruvian painter.
Ismael Bonilla (1978–2020) – Spanish motorcycle racer
Jaime Bonilla Valdez (born 1950), Mexican politician and entrepreneur who served as Governor of Baja California from 2019 to 2021
Javi Bonilla (born 1990), Spanish footballer
Jesús Bonilla (born 1955), Spanish actor
José Bonilla, Maexican astronomer who in 1883 took the earliest known photograph of an unidentified flying object, the Bonilla Observation
Jose Bonilla (boxer) (1967–2002), Venezuelan boxer and former world champion
José Eulogio Bonilla (born 1946), Mexican politician, senator
José María Bonilla (1889–1957), Guatemalan writer
José Santiago de Bonilla y Laya-Bolívar (1756–1824), Costa Rican politician
Juan Bonilla (baseball) (born 1955), Puerto Rican baseball player
Juan Bonilla (bishop) (1636–1696), bishop of Ariano, 1689–96
Juan Bonilla (writer) (born 1966), Spanish writer
Juan Crisóstomo Bonilla (1835–1884), Mexican general
Juan José de Bonilla y Herdocia (1790–1847), Costa Rican politician
Leonor Bonilla (born 1970), Mexican actress
Leydy Bonilla – Dominican singer
Lisalverto Bonilla – Dominican baseball pitcher
Manuel Bonilla – President of Honduras from 1903 to 1907 and from 1912 to 1913
Marc Bonilla (born 1955), American guitarist.
Nelson Bonilla (born 1990), Salvadoran footballer
Olivia Bonilla (born 1992), American singer-songwriter and musician
Óscar Bonilla (born 1978), Honduran footballer
Pablo Bonilla (born 1999), Venezuelan footballer 
Policarpo Bonilla (1858–1926), President of Honduras from 1894 to 1899.
Socorro Bonilla (born 1947), Mexican actress
Susan Bonilla (born 1960), American politician who served in the California State Assembly
Víctor Bonilla (born 1971), Colombian footballer
Yarimar Bonilla (born 1975), Puerto Rican political anthropologist

See also 
Ignacio Bonillas – Mexican diplomat and former Mexican ambassador of the United States of America.
Iñaki Bonillas – Mexican artist.
Alfonso Bonilla Aragón International Airport – Airport in Cali, Colombia.
Bonilla, South Dakota
Juan C. Bonilla (municipality), a municipality in Puebla, Mexico
Lake Bonilla, Costa Rica